The 1950 Men's World Weightlifting Championships were held in Paris, France from October 13 to October 15, 1950. There were 56 men in action from 17 nations.

Medal summary

Medal table

References
Results (Sport 123)
Weightlifting World Championships Seniors Statistics

External links
International Weightlifting Federation

World Weightlifting Championships
World Weightlifting Championships
International weightlifting competitions hosted by France
World Weightlifting Championships